"We'll Be Back" is a song by American thrash metal band Megadeth. The song was released as the lead single from their sixteenth studio album, The Sick, the Dying... and the Dead!, on June 23, 2022. The song is the first single the band has released since 2016, with "Post American World". On November 15, 2022, "We'll Be Back" was announced as a nominee for Best Metal Performance for the 65th Annual Grammy Awards.

Music and lyrics
"We'll Be Back" is about a soldier's tale of bravery, personal sacrifice, and their will to survive.

Performances 
It was the first song from the album to be played live.

Music video 
A music video was made for the song, the first of the three music videos leading up to the release of the album chronicling the origins of the band's mascot Vic Rattlehead. The music video depicts close-quarter military gun battles.

The band said about the music video:

“Witness “We’ll Be Back: Chapter I” — an epic, action-packed short film chronicling the origins of Vic Rattlehead. Created by Dave Mustaine, produced by Rafael Pensado, and directed by Leo Liberti, “We’ll Be Back: Chapter I” is a soldier’s tale of bravery, personal sacrifice, and the will to survive. It is the first installment of a trilogy of videos to be released in conjunction with the release of our new album ‘The Sick, The Dying… and The Dead!'”

This is the first music video to feature James LoMenzo as bassist since "Head Crusher" from the 2009 album Endgame. LoMenzo returned as Megadeth's bassist in 2021 initially as touring replacement for David Ellefson, who was fired in May of that year, and was announced as new bassist the following year.

Personnel 

 Dave Mustaine – lead vocals, lead and rhythm guitar
 Kiko Loureiro – lead guitar, backing vocals
 Dirk Verbeuren – drums
Additional musicians

 Steve Di Giorgio – bass
 Eric Darken – percussion on tracks
 Roger Lima – keyboards and effects

Production

 Dave Mustaine – co-production, engineering, art concept
 Chris Rakestraw – co-production, engineering
 Lowell Reynolds – assistant engineering
 Maddie Harmon – assistant engineering
 Rick West – drum technician
 Josh Wilbur – mixing
 Ted Jensen – mastering

References

External links 
 "We'll Be Back: Chapter I" music video

Megadeth songs
2022 songs
2022 singles
Songs written by Kiko Loureiro
Songs written by Dave Mustaine
Universal Music Group singles